NDSF may mean:

 Nano differential scanning fluorimetry
 National Defense Sealift Fund, a U.S. Navy budget appropriation; see 
 National Development and Social Fund, a citizenship scheme funded largely by Maltese passport fees
 National Diploma of the Society of Floristry
 Notre Dame Shakespeare Festival

See also
 Non-zero dispersion-shifted fiber (NZDSF)